Spottswood may refer to:

Given name:
Spottswood William Robinson III (1916–1998), American educator, civil rights attorney, and federal judge
Spottswood Poles (1887–1962), American outfielder in baseball's Negro leagues
Spottswood Bolling, plaintiff in the Civil Rights lawsuit Bolling v. Sharpe (1954)

Surname:
Alexander Spottswood (1676–1740), Lieutenant-Colonel in the British Army and a noted Lieutenant Governor of Virginia
Richard K. Spottswood (born 1937), musicologist and author from Maryland, catalogued thousands of recordings of vernacular music in the United States
Stephen Gill Spottswood (1897–1974), religious leader and civil rights activist known for his work as bishop of the African Methodist Episcopal Zion Church (AMEZ)

Geography:
Spottswood, Virginia, unincorporated community in Augusta County, Virginia, United States

See also
Spotswood (disambiguation)
Spottiswoode (disambiguation)